Samuel Adrian (born 2 March 1998) is a Swedish footballer. He is currently playing as a midfielder for Jönköpings Södra, on loan from Malmö FF.

Career statistics
As of 30 August 2018.

References

External links
 Malmö FF profile 
 
 
 
 

1998 births
Living people
Swedish footballers
Sweden youth international footballers
Sweden under-21 international footballers
Footballers from Skåne County
Malmö FF players
Kalmar FF players
Allsvenskan players
Association football midfielders